Regal Rexnord Corporation, usually referred to as just Regal Rexnord,  is a manufacturer of electric motors and power transmission components headquartered in Beloit, Wisconsin. The company has manufacturing, sales, and service facilities throughout the United States, Canada, Mexico, Europe and Asia, with about 29,000 employees. As of year 2021, the company is ranked 763rd on the Fortune 1000, and was the 17th largest corporation in Wisconsin.

One of the largest electric motor manufacturers in the world, its Genteq brand brushless DC electric motors are found in almost all variable-speed residential HVAC equipment in the United States today, and its GE Commercial Motors, Leeson, and Marathon Electric Motor brands are used throughout the industrial sector.

History
The company was founded in 1955 as Beloit Tool Corporation, and began operations in a converted roller rink. In 1961, it moved to facilities in South Beloit, Illinois, and in 1969 it changed its name to Regal Beloit. In the 1980s the company expanded its product line with a series of acquisitions of smaller companies, and in 1991 its headquarters were moved to downtown Beloit. One of Regal's acquisitions was Marathon Special Products, producing terminal blocks, power distribution blocks and fuseholders manufactured in Bowling Green, Ohio, with new products being added regularly in addition to the Kulka brand.  In 2004, two acquisitions from General Electric effectively doubled the size of the company.

In July 2007, Regal acquired the Fasco electrical components business of Tecumseh Products for $220 million in cash.

In 2007, Regal Beloit corporation USA acquired Alstom India Motors and Fans business and named as Marathon Electric Motors India Limited.

In October 2008, Regal acquired the Dutchi Motors B. V.  for $34 million in cash and $3.2 million in net liabilities.

In April 2010, the company acquired CMG Engineering Group, a manufacturer of industrial motors, blowers and metal products, for $75 million in cash.

In 2011, the company completed the largest acquisition in its history by purchasing A.O. Smith's Electrical Products Company. This acquisition added about $700 million in sales revenues, and further expanded the company in Mexico and China, while adding new products to its production lines.

On 9 July 2013, Regal Beloit announced that its plant in Springfield, Missouri, would face a staged closing over the next 18 months, impacting 330 employees.

On 5 June 2014, Regal Beloit announced that further closing of two plants in Kentucky, a staged closing over the next 18 months that is affecting over 200 employees.

Regal Beloit acquired Power Transmission Solutions business (PTS) from Emerson Electric Co. for approximately $1.4 billion — $1.4 billion in cash plus $40 million of assumed liabilities, effective from Jan 30th, 2015. The business manufactures, sells and services bearings, couplings, gearing, drive components, and conveyor systems under brands including Browning, Jaure, Kop-Flex, McGill, Morse, Rollway, Sealmaster and System Plast.  With annual revenues of approximately $600 million, PTS has over 3,000 employees around the world.  PTS will become part of Regal's newly defined Power Transmission segment.

In 2019, Regal Beloit America announced it would be closing its Durst Power Transmission plant in Shopiere, WI. The closure started on January 31, 2020, affected approximately 60 employees.

In October 2021, Regal Beloit Corporation completed its merger with Rexnord Corporation, creating Regal Rexnord Corporation.

In November 2021, Regal Rexnord closes on $297M acquisition of Arrowhead Systems LLC, which has Wisconsin operations in Randolph and Oshkosh.

In October 2022, the company announced its intent to buy its rival Altra Industrial Motion for about $5billion including debt.

Marathon Electric Motors (India) Limited 

Marathon Electric Kolkata started its journey as GEC UK, after the European Union was formed GEC of UK and Alsthom of France merged to form GEC Alsthom, then this Company became Alstom. In 2007, Regal Rexnord Corporation of USA acquired Alstom India's Motor & Fan business and was named "Marathon Electric Motors India Limited".

Marathon Kolkata manufactures both LT induction & Large HT induction motors for domestic, commercial & industrial segments.  These motors are available as per industry requirements of the safe area and hazardous area applications. Marathon also makes axial, propeller & centrifugal Industrial Fans.

Marathon Electric Motors has the following manufacturing facilities
 Kolkata works for HT & LT motors
 Ahmedabad works for LT motors

Additionally, Marathon India has 2 "global technology centers" one in Hyderabad and another in Pune and one manufacturing facility for FHP & LT motors located in Faridabad

Global Technology Centre - India (GTCI)
Located in Hyderabad and Pune, GTCI is Engineering and Info-Tech hub, where Engineering and IT teams operate in collaboration with worldwide Regal Rexnord centers. Hyderabad GTCI Established in August 2005 & Pune GTCI in July 2015. These centers are global R & D support arms for the Regal Rexnord Corporation.

References

Companies listed on the New York Stock Exchange
Manufacturing companies established in 1955
Beloit, Wisconsin
Companies based in Wisconsin
1955 establishments in Wisconsin